The men's 100 metres sprint event at the 1984 Olympic Games took place between August 3 and August 4. Eighty-two athletes from 59 countries participated. Each nation was limited to 3 athletes per rules in force since the 1930 Olympic Congress. The event was won by Carl Lewis of the United States, that nation's first title after two Games of missing the podium (4th in 1976, boycotted in 1980). Canada's Ben Johnson took bronze to break up the Americans' bid to sweep the podium (which they had done in 1904 and 1912); it was Canada's first medal in the event since 1964.

Background

This was the twentieth time the event was held, having appeared at every Olympics since the first in 1896. Defending gold medal winner Allan Wells of Great Britain was the only finalist from the Moscow Games to return. The American team was strong, led by 1983 World Championships in Athletics winner Carl Lewis, who was attempting to match Jesse Owens's 1936 quadruple (100, 200, 4x100, and long jump). Sam Graddy and Ron Brown were the other members of the United States squad, edging out world record holder and World Championships runner-up Calvin Smith. Challengers to the hosts included World Championship finalists Wells, Paul Narracott of Australia, Christian Haas of West Germany, and Desai Williams of Canada, as well as up-and-coming Canadian sprinter Ben Johnson.

Thirteen nations appeared in the event for the first time: Antigua and Barbuda, Bangladesh, the British Virgin Islands, China (in its People's Republic form), Costa Rica, Equatorial Guinea, The Gambia, Mauritius, Oman, Qatar, the Solomon Islands, Swaziland, and the United Arab Emirates. The United States made its 19th appearance in the event, most of any country, having missed only the boycotted 1980 Games.

Competition format

The event retained the same basic four round format introduced in 1920: heats, quarterfinals, semifinals, and a final. The "fastest loser" system, introduced in 1968, was used again to ensure that the quarterfinals and subsequent rounds had exactly 8 runners per heat; this time, the system was used in both the preliminaries and quarterfinals.

The first round consisted of 11 heats, each with 7 or 8 athletes. The top three runners in each heat advanced, along with the next seven fastest runners overall. This made 40 quarterfinalists, who were divided into 5 heats of 8 runners. The top three runners in each quarterfinal advanced, with one "fastest loser" place. The 16 semifinalists competed in two heats of 8, with the top four in each semifinal advancing to the eight-man final.

Records

These are the standing world and Olympic records (in seconds) prior to the 1980 Summer Olympics.

Results

Heats

The top three runners in each of the eleven heats and the next seven fastest, advanced to the quarterfinal round.

Heat 1

Heat 2

Heat 3

Heat 4

Heat 5

Heat 6

Heat 7

Heat 8

Heat 9

Heat 10

Heat 11

Quarterfinals

The top three runners in each of the five heats and the next fastest one, advanced to the semifinal round.

Quarterfinal 1

Quarterfinal 2

Quarterfinal 3

Quarterfinal 4

Quarterfinal 5

Semifinals

The top four runners in each of the two heats advanced to the final round.

Semifinal 1
The wind was +0.7 m/s.

Semifinal 2
The wind was -1.5 m/s.

Final
Wind = 0.2 m/s

See also
Athletics at the Friendship Games – Men's 100 metres

References

Athletics at the 1984 Summer Olympics
100 metres at the Olympics
Men's events at the 1984 Summer Olympics